E3 series may refer to:

E3 series (preferred numbers), a series of standardized resistor and capacitor values
E3 series (train), a Japanese Shinkansen train since 1997

See also
E3 (disambiguation)